Lady Boss is a 1990 novel written by Jackie Collins and the third in her Santangelo novels series.

The novel was adapted as a TV movie miniseries in 1992, starring Kim Delaney in the title role of Lucky Santangelo. Co-stars include Jack Scalia, Yvette Mimieux, Joan Rivers, Beth Toussaint, Alan Rachins, Vanity, and John Randolph.

Plot
Lady Boss tells the story of Lucky Santangelo taking over a movie studio in Hollywood called "Panther Studios."

Miniseries
The novel inspired a miniseries with the teleplay by Jackie Collins and directed by Charles Jarrott in 1992.

Cast

Main
 Kim Delaney as Lucky Santangelo
 Jack Scalia as Lennie Golden
 Alan Rachins as Mickey Stolli
 Phil Morris as Steven Dimes
 Yvette Mimieux as Deena Swanson
 Beth Toussaint as Venus Maria
 Vanity as Mary Lou Morley
 Scott Valentine as Ron
 Robin Strasser as Abigaile Stolli

Supporting
 John Randolph as Abe Panther
 Joe Cortese as Santino Bonnatti (credited as Joseph Cortese)
 Jeff Kaake as Eddie Kane
 Douglas Barr as Jerry Masterson
 Georgann Johnson as Olive Sertner
 Tony Denison as Cooper Turner (credited as Anthony John Denison)
 Joan Rivers as Bibi Grant
 David Selby as Martin Swanson
 Daniel Quinn as Emilio
 William Shockley as Axel Porter
 Vanessa Angel as Christie
 Kiki Shepard as Warner Franklin

References

1990 British novels
Santangelo novels